Wabana is a Canadian town and the largest, and only incorporated, community on Bell Island in the province of Newfoundland and Labrador.

Geography

The town is situated on the northeast end of the island and was incorporated in 1950.  Bell Island's soil contains red hematite or iron ore and this resource was the main reason for Wabana's development.

Economy

Wabana came to prominence during the 1890s when the Butler family from Port de Grave staked mining claims on the north side of the island.  These were sold to the Nova Scotia Steel Company and later sold to the Dominion Steel Corporation in the early 1900s.  The first mine opened in 1896 and the site of the mines was named Wabana by Thomas Cantly, an official with Nova Scotia Steel Co. - the name being Abenaki for "place where the light shines first."

The mines saw Wabana's population swell to 14,000 within a few years, the second largest community in the Dominion of Newfoundland.  101 workers lost their lives over the course of Bell Island's iron ore industry.

A further 65 sailors on merchant ships were lost on two separate attacks by German U-boats in the fall of 1942 which saw 4 cargo ships for carrying iron ore to the steel mill at Sydney, Nova Scotia sunk.

Wabana's population declined following World War II as the underground mines began to face shortfalls in production, being forced to compete with more efficient open pit mines in Labrador and Minnesota.  The parent company, Dominion Steel and Coal Corporation (DOSCO), had been in operation since 1930 and was taken over by other conglomerates in the late 1950s.  The steel mill and coal mines in Nova Scotia were facing uncertain futures and their shut down was announced in 1965 (although they were subsequently nationalized).

The expected announcement of the shut down of the iron ore mines in Wabana came on April 19, 1966.  Following their closure, the mines were left to flood and the population of Wabana has since steadily declined.

Today, the working population mostly commutes to St. John's on a daily basis, while in the summer a tour of one of the decommissioned mines draws tourism to the island.

Demographics 

Notable people
Allan Hawco
David Brazil (politician)
David Jackman (politician) 
Harry Hibbs (musician)

References

Populated coastal places in Canada
Towns in Newfoundland and Labrador
Road-inaccessible communities of Newfoundland and Labrador
Mining communities in Newfoundland and Labrador